Slieveboy  is a mountain located in north County Wexford, Ireland.

Etymology 
It is never called 'Slieveboy' by locals, but always its Irish form Sliabh Buí, which is pronounced 'Shleeav Bwee'. Sliabh Buí means Yellow Mountain.

Geography 
The mountain rises directly above the village of Ballyduff, midway between Carnew and Camolin. The mountain is, except for the area around the summit, completely covered in forest. There is a network of forest roads on  the hill, and two communication masts on the summit.

References

See also
 Wicklow Mountains
 List of mountains in Ireland

Mountains and hills of County Wexford
Marilyns of Ireland